The Radio-télévision belge de la Communauté française (RTBF, Belgian Radio-television  of the French Community, branded as rtbf.be) is a public service broadcaster delivering radio and television services to the French-speaking Community of Belgium, in Wallonia and Brussels. Its counterpart in the Flemish Community is the Dutch-language VRT (Vlaamse Radio- en Televisieomroeporganisatie), and in the German-speaking Community it is BRF (Belgischer Rundfunk).

The organisation's headquarters in Brussels, which is shared with VRT, is sometimes referred to colloquially as Reyers.

History 

Originally named the Belgian National Broadcasting Institute, the state-owned broadcasting organisation was established by law on 18 June 1930, and from 1938 was housed in Le Flagey, formerly known as the Maison de la Radio, a purpose-built building in the "paquebot" style of Art Deco architecture.

On 14 June 1940 the INR was forced to cease broadcasting as a result of the German invasion.

At the end of the war the INR and the RNB coexisted until 14 September 1945, when a Royal Decree merged the two and restored the INR's original mission. The INR was one of 23 broadcasting organisations which founded the European Broadcasting Union in 1950. Television broadcasting from Brussels began in 1953, with two hours of programming each day. In 1960 the INR was subsumed into RTB and moved to new quarters at the Reyers building in 1967. RTB's first broadcast in colour,  (a gardening and nature programme), was transmitted in 1971. Two years later, RTB began broadcasting news in colour.

In 1977, broadcasting became a concern for Belgium's language communities, rather than the national government as a whole. Accordingly, the French-language section of RTB became RTBF and a second television channel was set up with the name . In 1979  became . On 21 March 1988,  became . On 27 September 1989 a joint-venture company of RTBF  and Vivendi was set up with the name , which subsequently became  in May 1995.

In mid-January 2010, RTBF adopted the new branding of RTBF.be in its main logo. The change was made because of the growing importance of new media; the ".be" suffix stresses these new developments.

On 11 June 2013, RTBF was one of the few European public broadcasters to join in condemning the closure of Greece's public broadcaster, ERT.

By 2011, the analogue systems for RTBF.be were planned to be phased out for Wallonia.

Bye Bye Belgium

On 13 December 2006, at 20:21 CET (19:21 UTC), RTBF replaced an edition of its regular current affairs programme  with a fake special news report in which it was claimed that Flanders had proclaimed independence, effectively dissolving the Belgian state. The programme had been preceded by a caption reading "This may not be fiction", which was repeated intermittently as a subtitle to the images on screen. After the first half-hour of the 90-minute broadcast, however – by which point RTBF.be's response line had been flooded with calls – this was replaced with a caption reading "This is fiction".

The video featured images of news reporters standing in front of the Flemish Parliament, while Flemish separatists waved the flag of Flanders behind them. Off to the side, Francophone and Belgian nationalists were waving Belgian flags. The report also featured footage of King Albert and Queen Paola getting on a military jet to Congo, a former Belgian colony.

RTBF justified the hoax on the grounds that it raised the issue of Flemish nationalism, but others felt that it raised the issue of about how much the public can trust the press.

Logo history

Television channels
Television channels are transmitted: 
 On cable: analogue and digital on all Belgian cable providers, as well as on cable in Luxembourg;
 On DSL lines through IPTV to Proximus, Scarlet and Billi customers, as well as PostTV in Luxembourg;
 On satellite free-to-air worldwide as a participant in francophone  channel;
 On digital terrestrial television using DVB-T on UHF and VHF frequencies in Brussels and Wallonia.

Current channels
  (Channel One): RTBF's main channel television, formerly known as RTBF1; began in 1953 on VHF channel 10; in PAL color since 1973
  (Channel Three): the quality TV channel; began in 2007; there are no commercial adverts on this channel
 : in collaboration with the Franco-German TV network

Video on demand
The Video on demand (VOD) offer of the RTBF is available on several platforms:
 Web: Free VOD has been collected under the RTBF  brand since 2016. Offering Catch up TV, allowing viewers to see all programs from the RTBF channels during 7 days after broadcast.
 IDTV: Free catch up TV and pay VOD
 Video game consoles: PlayStation 3, PlayStation 4 and Xbox One

Radio channels
The RTBF broadcasts radio channels in either analogue format (FM and digital format (using DAB and DVB-T). All channels are also broadcast live over the Internet.

Analogue and digital

Digital-only channels
 : Focus on the "Golden Sixties"
 : Focus on music from the 1970s
 : Focus on music from the 1980s
 : Focus on music from the 1990s
 : Focus on Blues
 : Focus on Metal
 : Focus on Route 66 music
 : Focus on Soul
 : Web radio for children from 8 to 13 years old.
 : Focus on new talents
 : Focus on relaxed music
 : Focus on urban music

They also have a TMC service transmitted on Classic 21.

See also
 VRT
 List of television channels in Belgium
 Public Francophone Radios

Notes and references

External links

  
 
 

Television networks in Belgium
French-language television networks
Television channels in Belgium
Publicly funded broadcasters
French-language television in Belgium
European Broadcasting Union members
Radio stations established in 1930
Television channels and stations established in 1953
1977 establishments in Belgium
State media
Mass media in Brussels